Alex Marshall may refer to:

 Alex Marshall (Days of Our Lives), a character in Days of Our Lives
 Alex Marshall (actor and director) (born 1945), actress, later a television and theatre director 
 Alex Marshall (police officer) (born 1961), Chief Constable of Hampshire Constabulary, England
 Alex Marshall (bowls) (born 1967), British lawn bowler
 Alex Marshall (journalist) (born 1959), American journalist
 Alex Marshall (footballer) (born 1998), Jamaican footballer
 Alex T. Marshall (born 1989), American musician
 Alex Marshall, a pen name of Jesse Bullington, American fantasy writer

See also
Alexander Marshall (disambiguation)